The 2015 Samford Bulldogs football team represented Samford University in the 2015 NCAA Division I FCS football season. They were led by first year head coach Chris Hatcher and played their home games at Seibert Stadium. They were a member of the Southern Conference. They finished the season 6–5, 3–4 in SoCon play to finish in a tie for fourth place with the Wofford Terriers.

Schedule

References

Samford
Samford Bulldogs football seasons
Samford Bulldogs football